Rice Creek is a creek located in the Boundary Country region of British Columbia.  The creek flows into McKinney Creek from the east.  This creek has been mined for gold.

References

External links
 

Rivers of British Columbia